Ralam Glacier is one of the main Himalayan glaciers situated on the hills of Pithoragarh district of Uttarakhand, India. Munsiyari is the base for the trek. This glacier is situated near Ralam Dhura at Ralam Khal. It lies at the base of the Great Himalayan Wall. The glacier is glaciologically divided into two parts named Upper Ralam and Lower Ralam.

See also
 List of glaciers

References 

Glaciers of Uttarakhand
Geography of Pithoragarh district